Abderrahmane Tamada (born 6 October 1985) is a Tunisian former track and field athlete who competed in the pole vault. He was the gold medallist at the 2007 All-Africa Games and runner-up at the 2006 African Championships in Athletics. He won medals at the Arab Junior Athletics Championships, Arab Athletics Championships and the Pan Arab Games.

International competitions

References

External links

Living people
1985 births
Tunisian male pole vaulters
African Games gold medalists for Tunisia
African Games medalists in athletics (track and field)
Athletes (track and field) at the 2007 All-Africa Games
21st-century Tunisian people
20th-century Tunisian people